In addition to its classical and literary form, Malay had various regional dialects established after the rise of the Srivijaya empire in Sumatra, Indonesia. Also, Malay spread through interethnic contact and trade across the Malay Archipelago as far as the Philippines. That contact resulted in a lingua franca ("trade language") that was called Bazaar Malay or low Malay and in Malay Melayu Pasar. It is generally believed that Bazaar Malay was a pidgin, influenced by contact among Malay, Hokkien, Portuguese, and Dutch traders.

Besides the general simplification that occurs with pidgins, the Malay lingua franca had several distinctive characteristics. One was that possessives were formed with punya 'its owner'; another was that plural pronouns were formed with orang 'person'. The only Malayic affixes that remained productive were tĕr- and bĕr-.

Other features:
Ada became a progressive particle.
Reduced forms of ini 'this' and itu 'that' before a noun became determiners.
The verb pĕrgi 'go' was reduced, and became a preposition 'towards'.
Causative constructions were formed with kasi or bĕri 'to give' or bikin or buat 'to make'.
Ini becomes to ni 
Itu becomes to  tu
A single preposition, often sama, was used for multiple functions, including direct and indirect object.

For example,
 Rumah-ku 'my house' becomes Saya punya rumah
 Saya pukul dia 'I hit him' becomes Saya kasi pukul dia
 Megat dipukul Robert 'Megat is hit by Robert' becomes Megat dipukul dek Robert

Bazaar Malay is used in a limited extent in Singapore and Malaysia, mostly among the older generation or people with no working knowledge of English. The most important reason that contributed to the decline of Bazaar Malay is that pidgin Malay has creolised and created several new languages. Another reason is due to language shift in both formal and informal contexts, Bazaar Malay in Singapore is gradually being replaced by English, with English and its creole Singlish being the lingua franca among the younger generations.

Baba Malay

Baba Malay is spoken by the Peranakans. A typical contact language between Hokkien male settlers and local Malay women, it has "more Hokkien grammar and more Malay lexicon". As of 2014, there are 1,000 speakers in Malaysia and another 1,000 in Singapore. It is mostly spoken among the older populations. In 1986, Pakir estimated there were 5,000 speakers in Singapore.

A kind of Baba Malay, called Peranakan, is spoken among Chinese living in East Java. It is a mixture of Malay or Indonesian with local Javanese (East Javanese dialect) and Chinese elements (particularly Hokkien). This particular variety is found only in East Java, especially in Surabaya and surrounding areas. While other Chinese tend to speak the language varieties of the places in which they live (the Chinese of Central Java speak High or Standard Javanese in daily conversation even among themselves; in West Java, they tend to speak Sundanese), in Surabaya younger ethnic Chinese people tend to speak pure Javanese (Surabaya dialect) and learn Mandarin in courses.

Example (spoken in Surabaya):
 : Don't act that way!
 Yak apa kabarnya si Eli?: How's Eli?
 Ntik kamu pigio ambek cecemu ae ya.: Go with your sister, okay?
 Nih, makanen sakadae.: Please have a meal!
 Kamu cariken bukune koko ndhek rumahe Ling Ling.: Search your brother's book in Ling Ling's house.

Example (spoken in Melaka-Singapore):
 : He likes to come here and gossip.
 Keliap-keliap, dia naik angin.: Slightly provoked, he gets angry.
 Gua tunggu dia sampai gua k'ee geram.: I waited for him until I got angry.
 Oo-wa! Kinajeet, dia pasang kuat.: Wow! Today he dresses stylishly!

Betawi Malay

Malaccan Creole Malay

Sri Lanka Malay

Singapore Bazaar Malay 
Singapore Bazaar Malay, also known as Bazaar Malay, Pasar Malay, or Market Malay, is a Malay-lexified pidgin, which is spoken in Singapore. Tamil and Hokkien contributed to the development of Bazaar Malay, with Hokkien being the dominant substrate language of Bazaar Malay, with Malay being the lexifier language. However, there are many input languages spoken by immigrants that also contributed to the development of Bazaar Malay, including languages spoken by Malays, Chinese, Indians, Eurasians, and Europeans. Singapore Bazaar Malay emerged along with the opening of Singapore's free trade port in 1819, to overcome barriers in communication and business transactions. Since Singapore has only four official languages (English, Mandarin, Malay, and Tamil), Singapore Bazaar Malay not only is a lingua franca in interethnic communication, it is also used in intra-group communication. Singapore Bazaar Malay is mostly spoken by elders and middle-aged workers today, but its language status is declining due to education policies and language campaigns with less than 10,000 speakers.

Sabah Malay

A pidginised variant of standard Malay, Sabah Malay is a local trade language. There are a large number of native speakers in urban areas, mainly children who have a second native language. There are also some speakers in the southernmost parts of the Philippines, particularly in the Sulu Archipelago as a trade language, also spoken in south Palawan.

Makassar Malay

Makassar Malay is a creole-based mixed language, which is built of Bazaar Malay lexicon, Makassarese inflections, and mixed Malay/Makassarese syntax.

It is now widely spoken as the first language in Makassar City and its surrounding areas, especially those who were born after 1980's. It has widely spread to the entire region in southern part of Sulawesi island, including in the provinces of Sulawesi Selatan, Sulawesi Tenggara, and Sulawesi Barat as regional lingua franca or as second language due to contact or doing business with people from Makassar City.

Makassar Malay used as a default dialect or neutral language when communicating with people from other tribes or ethnicities whom do not share the same local language to the native local speakers in those three provinces. It appears that Makassar Malay also used as the first language of younger generation who live in the cities or regencies' capital across those three provinces.

Furthermore, apart from those three provinces in the southern part of Sulawesi island, Makassar Malay also used by people in some parts of Sulawesi Tengah Province, especially when communicating with people from those three provinces. It can also be used when communicating with people from other people from other provinces in Eastern Indonesia and in the province of Kalimantan Timur.

Balinese Malay

Balinese Malay is a dialect of Malay spoken in the island of Bali. Balinese Malay is the primary language of ethnic Malay who live in the northwestern part of the island, mainly in the districts of Melaya and Negara, Jembrana Regency. The current language status is threatened.

Broome Pearling Lugger Pidgin

Eastern Indonesian Malay

The creoles of eastern Indonesia appear to have formed as Malays and Javanese, using lingua franca Malay, established their monopoly on the spice trade before the European colonial era. They have a number of features in common:
ā, ē becomes a, e, or assimilates to the following vowel
i, u lower to e, o in some environments
there is a loss of final plosives p, t, k, and n the neutralisation of final nasals in part of the lexicon
the  perfective marker  juga reduces to ju or jo
the  perfective marker  lebih  reduces to le 
the  perfective marker  mau reduces to mo
the  perfective marker mana reduces to ma (as this only occur on Kupang Malay).
the perfective marker dan reduces to deng
the perfective marker  pun reduces to  pung
the perfective marker sudah reduces to su or so

For example,
  becomes 
 pērgi becomes pigi or pi,pe
 tērkējut becomes takajo
 lēmbut becomes lombo
 dapāt becomes dapa
jangan becomes jang
pada becomes pa
 lupa becomes lu

Bacan (next) is perhaps the most archaic, and appears to be closely related to Brunei Malay (which is still a creole).

There is a loss of diphthongs:

 the diphthong "au" become to "o" 
 the diphthong "ai" reduces to "e"
 the letter" u" become to "o"

The prefix word with "me","be","te",and"ke"  reduces to "ma","ba","ta","ka"

 The prefix "me" redues to "ma"
 The prefix "be",reduces to "ba"
 The prefix "te",reduces to "ta"

For example:

The loss of middle "e" and "h" in the last end of words:

 terbelah becomes tabla
 bertengkar becomes batengkar
 menangis becomes manangis
kehidupan becomes kaidopan

Bacanese Malay

Bacanese Malay is a Malayic isolect spoken in Bacan Island and its surroundings, south of Halmahera, North Maluku. Bacanese Malay is considered rather different from other Malay-derived languages in eastern Indonesia because of its archaic lexicon and was used as a supplementary language in the reconstruction of Proto-Malayic.

Some Bacanese words occur in Wiltens & Danckaerts' 1623 vocabulary. Bacanese is also reviewed in Adriani & Kruijt's 1914 monograph. The most detailed studies are by James T. Collins, who concludes that Bacan is indeed a Malay variety, descended from the Malay used in the Bacan Sultanate.

Dili Malay 

Dili Malay is a creole-based Malay language spoken in Kampung Alor, Dili. This language has a lot of borrowed vocabulary from Tetun and Portuguese language. As of 2000, it was spoken by about 1,000 people.

Manado Malay

Gorap 

Gorap is lexically 85% Malay, but has many Ternate words as well, and word order differs from both Austronesian and Halmahera languages. Children no longer acquire the language.

Ternate / North Moluccan Malay

Kupang Malay 

Kupang Malay is spoken in Kupang, East Nusa Tenggara, on the west end of Timor Island. It is based on archaic Malay which mixed mostly with Dutch, Portuguese and local languages. Similar to Ambonese Malay with several differences in vocabulary and accent. Its grammatical system resembles that of other East Indonesian Malay Creoles.

The pronouns in Kupang Malay differ from Indonesian as shown in the table below:

Unlike in Indonesian, there is no schwa in Kupang Malay. 

The word order of  Kupang Malay is mixed Malay and the Helong Language .

The "ia ,"ie, "io",and iu,reduces to iya, iye, iyo, iyu  or nua, oa, os  becomes nuwa, woa, wos.

 The lack of foreign letters e.g. "z","v",and"q"

For example;

 Zaman → 
 Video → 
 Qatar →

Alor Malay

Alor Malay is spoken in the Alor archipelago. Speakers perceive Alor Malay to be a different register of standard Indonesian, but both of these are prestige varieties of the archipelago. Many people are able to understand standard Indonesian, but cannot speak it fluently and choose to use Alor Malay on a daily basis.

Alor Malay is based on Kupang Malay; however, Alor Malay differs significantly from Kupang Malay, especially in its pronouns.

Ambonese Malay

Bandanese Malay

Bandanese Malay is a distinct variant of Moluccan Malay, spoken in Banda Islands, Maluku. Significantly different from Ambonese Malay and for Ambonese, Bandanese Malay tends to be perceived as sounding funny due to its unique features.

Example :
  : I
  : you
  : we
  : ants (deviated from Dutch)

Papuan/Irian Malay

Creole languages based on languages other than Malay

Javindo language
Orang Pulo language
Petjo language

References

External links

 A Baba Malay Dictionary by William Gwee Thian Hock
 Malay creole boy, Hottentot Square Cape Town; Malay boy of Cape Town [picture] / George French Angas delt. et lithog.
 The Malay Chetty Creole Language Of Malacca A Historical And Linguistic Perspective

Bibliography
Ethnologue: Malay-based creoles

 
Languages of Indonesia
Languages of Malaysia
Languages of Australia
Languages of Singapore
Pidgins and creoles
Malay dialects